Artus Quellinus can refer to three members of the Flemish Quellinus family, all sculptors:

 Artus Quellinus the Elder (or Artus I, 1609–1668)
 Artus Quellinus II (or the Younger, 1625–1700), cousin of Artus the Elder
 Artus Quellinus III (1653–1686), son of Artus II